Derek Murray is an Irish Gaelic footballer who plays for the Clondalkin-based Round Towers club and for the Dublin county team. Murray is also a teacher for Clonburris N.S. in Clondalkin.

Mr Murray chips and curry

Biography
Murray is from Clondalkin, Dublin. He attended Moyle Park Secondary School in Clondalkin Village. Murray currently plays for Round Towers GAA Club in Clondalkin with his brother Damien, winner of two Trench Cup Finals with the great IT Tallaght teams of the early 2000s. In many ways Damien has helped to mould Derek into both the footballer and man he is today. A renowned goal scorer, Derek has a goal to game ratio of over 3 to 1.

2006
Murray made his debut for Dublin in the 2006 O'Byrne Cup. He was rewarded with a starting place for Dublin vs Tyrone in the first round of the 2006 Allianz National League. But Murray did not make the 2006 Leinster Championship and All-Ireland squad. He did, however, take part in training sessions and was a Maor Uisce for Dublin's Leinster/All Ireland Championship campaign.

O'Byrne Cup
Murray regained his place on the Dublin panel for the 2007 O'Byrne Cup. He was part of the winning 2007 O'Byrne Cup team with the final finishing in extra time with a scoreline of 1-18 to 2-13 against Laois. Derek finished the tournament with a total haul of 1-03. Derek was on Dublins winning team for the 2008 O'Byrne Cup winning team which defeated Longford in the final.

References

Year of birth missing (living people)
Living people
Dublin inter-county Gaelic footballers
Irish schoolteachers
Round Towers Clondalkin Gaelic footballers
People from Clondalkin
Sportspeople from South Dublin (county)